Hernán Nicolás Encina (born 3 November 1982) is an Argentine football midfielder who plays for Guaraní Antonio Franco in the Primera B Nacional.

Career
Born in Rosario, Encina made his league debut in 2001 for Rosario Central, he made over 50 appearances for the club before joining Mexican side Tecos in 2007, later that year he played for Atlas.

In 2008 Encina returned to Argentina where he played for Colón de Santa Fe and then Godoy Cruz.

On June 7, 2009 Encina will be joining Barcelona for the second part of the Ecuadorian Serie A. On 19 January 2010 Club de Gimnasia y Esgrima La Plata has obtained on loan for six months the 27-year-old attacking midfielder.

References

External links
 Guardian statistics
 Official Club Player Profile 
 Argentine Primera statistics  
 El Universo 
 
 

1982 births
Living people
Footballers from Rosario, Santa Fe
Argentine footballers
Argentine expatriate footballers
Association football midfielders
Argentine Primera División players
Liga MX players
Ecuadorian Serie A players
Rosario Central footballers
Club Atlético Colón footballers
Godoy Cruz Antonio Tomba footballers
Club de Gimnasia y Esgrima La Plata footballers
Tecos F.C. footballers
Atlas F.C. footballers
Barcelona S.C. footballers
Talleres de Córdoba footballers
Olimpo footballers
Independiente Rivadavia footballers
Expatriate footballers in Ecuador
Expatriate footballers in Mexico